Khorramabad-e Sofla (also Romanized as Khorramābād-e Soflá; also known as Shahveh-ye Soflá) is a village in Jannatabad Rural District, Salehabad County, Razavi Khorasan Province, Iran. At the 2006 census, its population was 81, in 17 families.

References 

Populated places in   Torbat-e Jam County